Mormyrops is a genus of weakly electric fish in the family Mormyridae from freshwater in Africa. They are characterized by an elongate head measuring twice as long as high, and no teeth on the palate or the tongue.

Taxonomy and species

According to FishBase, there are currently 21 recognized species in this genus. One of these (marked with one star* in list) is often placed in its own genus Oxymormyrus instead, and yet another (marked with two stars**) has occasionally also been placed in that genus.

 Mormyrops anguilloides (Linnaeus 1758) (Cornish jack)
 Mormyrops attenuatus Boulenger 1898 (Upoto mormyrid)
 Mormyrops batesianus Boulenger 1909 (Bumba mormyrid)
 Mormyrops boulengeri* Pellegrin, 1900 (Alima River mormyrid)
 Mormyrops breviceps Steindachner 1894 (Liberian elephantfish)
 Mormyrops caballus Pellegrin 1927 (Sanaga mormyrid)
 Mormyrops citernii Vinciguerra 1912 (Genale mormyrid)
 Mormyrops curtus Boulenger 1899 (Boma mormyrid)
 Mormyrops curviceps Román 1966 (Bougouriba mormyrid)
 Mormyrops engystoma Boulenger 1898 (Matadi mormyrid)
 Mormyrops furcidens Pellegrin 1900 (Alima mormyrid)
 Mormyrops intermedius Vinciguerra 1928 (Rubi mormyrid)
 Mormyrops lineolatus Boulenger 1898
 Mormyrops mariae (Schilthuis, 1891) (Kinshasa mormyrid)
 Mormyrops masuianus Boulenger 1898
 Mormyrops microstoma Boulenger 1898 (New Antwerp mormyrid)
 Mormyrops nigricans Boulenger 1899 (Kutu mormyrid)
 Mormyrops oudoti Daget 1954 (Bamako mormyrid)
 Mormyrops parvus Boulenger 1899 (parvus mormyrid)
 Mormyrops sirenoides Boulenger 1898 (sirenoides mormyrid)
 Mormyrops zanclirostris** (Günther, 1867) (Pool elephantfish)

References

Mormyridae
Ray-finned fish genera